A131 may refer to:
 A131 road (England), a road connecting Little Waltham and Sudbury
 A131 motorway (France), a French motorway connecting the A13 and Le Havre
 RFA Reliant (A131), a 1976 Royal Fleet Auxiliary helicopter support ship